Rogale  (from 1938-45 Gahlen) is a village in the administrative district of Gmina Banie Mazurskie, within Gołdap County, Warmian-Masurian Voivodeship, in northern Poland, close to the border with the Kaliningrad Oblast of Russia.

The village has a population of 60.

References

Villages in Gołdap County